The 16th Finswimming World Championships were held at 30 July –6 August 2011 in Hódmezővásárhely, Hungary at the Gyarmati Dezső Sportuszoda.

The Confédération Mondiale des Activités Subaquatiques announced Hódmezővásárhely as the host city in February 2011 following the cancellation of the 2nd CMAS Games proposed for Neiva & San Andreas Island, Colombia.

Schedule

Medal table

 Host Nation

Long distance events
The long distance part of the 2011 Finswimming World Championships was held between 4–6 August in Hódmezővásárhely, Hungary at the Szeged rowing channel Maty-éri viztározó.

The following events were contested by both men and women in Hódmezővásárhely:

6 km individual
20 km individual
4x3 km relay

Schedule

Medal table

Medal summary

Men

Women

Pool events

The pool part of the 2011 Finswimming World Championships was held 30 July – 6 August at the Gyarmati Dezső Sportuszoda. in Hódmezővásárhely, Hungary.

The finswimming competition featured races in a long course (50 m) pool in 30 events (15 for males, 15 for females; 13 individual events and 2 relays for each gender).

The evening session schedule for the 2011 Finswimming Championships

Note: each distance had preliminary heats and finals, but only 800m immersion is on direct final in morning sessions.

Medal table

Results

Men's events

Women's events

See also

References

External links
CMAS 16th Finswimming World Championship

Finswimming World Championships
International sports competitions hosted by Hungary
Finswimming World Championships
Csongrád-Csanád County
Finswimming World Championships
Finswimming World Championships